Peppermint extract is an herbal extract of peppermint (Mentha × piperita) made from the essential oils of peppermint leaves. Peppermint is a hybrid of water mint and spearmint and was indigenous to Europe and the Middle East before it became common in other regions, such as North America and Asia.

Peppermint extract is commonly used in cooking, as a dietary supplement, as an herbal or alternative medicine, as a pest repellent, and a flavor or fragrance agent for cleaning products, cosmetics, mouthwash, chewing gum, and candies. Its active ingredient menthol activates the TRPM8 receptor in sensory neurons, resulting in a cold sensation when peppermint extract is consumed or used topically. There is insufficient evidence to conclude it is effective in treating any medical condition.

Extraction 
Peppermint extract can be obtained through steam distillation, solvent extraction, and soxhlet extraction.

Uses 
Peppermint extract is commonly used as a flavoring agent; it is also used as an antiseptic, anti-viral, and stimulant, although there is no sufficient evidence that peppermint extract is effective in treating any medical condition and the evidence of its antimicrobial properties is mixed. Moderate levels can be safely mixed into food items, or applied topically, sprayed on surfaces as a household cleaner, or inhaled using aromatherapy. However, the menthol in peppermint oil may cause serious side effects in children and infants if inhaled.

Uses in cooking
Peppermint extract can be used to add a peppermint flavor to baked goods, desserts, and candy, particularly candy canes, mints, and peppermint patties. Extracts for cooking may be labeled as pure, natural, imitation, or artificial. While pure and natural extracts contain peppermint oil specifically, imitation and artificial extracts generally use a mix of ingredients to achieve a flavor resembling peppermint.

Peppermint extract can be substituted in recipes with peppermint oil (a stronger ingredient primarily used in candy-making), crème de menthe, or peppermint schnapps. If the food is not heated, the alcoholic properties of liqueurs may remain present in the finished product.

Peppermint extract may also be added to hot water to create peppermint tea.

Medicinal uses 
In alternative medicine, peppermint extract is used to treat symptoms of the common cold and the flu, and to relieve bloating and flatulence. It is also used to treat symptoms of arthritis and rheumatism, to relieve menstrual cramps, and as a remedy for toothache.

There is suggestive but still inconclusive evidence for peppermint extract's effectiveness in treating irritable bowel syndrome with constipation, and in treating tension headaches.

Peppermint oil has been found to be an effective antispasmodic during upper gastric endoscopy, and has shown at least some effectiveness as a general GI tract antispasmodic.

Peppermint oil may help with "Hell's Itch", an extreme itching sensation that can occur several days after a sunburn.

Use as a pest repellent
Peppermint oil is commonly used to repel ants, flying insects, rodents, and spiders.

Use as a physical performance enhancer
Peppermint oil is used in endurance sports to improve mental and physical stamina.

References

Food additives